Ultimate Match Fishing is a sport fishing television series airing on the Outdoor Channel since 2005. It is hosted by Joe Thomas. While Mark Randolph was the referee. It has successfully completed 14 seasons and 15th is currently in on air.

References

External links

Official Website

2005 American television series debuts
2010s American television series
English-language television shows
American sports television series
Outdoor Channel original programming